The 1992–93 Bundesliga was the 30th season of the Bundesliga, Germany's premier football league. It began on 14 August 1992 and ended on 5 June 1993. VfB Stuttgart were the defending champions.

Competition modus
Every team played two games against each other team, one at home and one away. Teams received two points for a win and one point for a draw. If two or more teams were tied on points, places were determined by goal difference and, if still tied, by goals scored. The team with the most points were crowned champions while the three teams with the fewest points were relegated to 2. Bundesliga.

Team changes to 1991–92
Stuttgarter Kickers, Hansa Rostock, MSV Duisburg and Fortuna Düsseldorf were relegated to the 2. Bundesliga after finishing in the last four places. Due to a size reduction back to 18 teams, only two teams were promoted. These were Bayer 05 Uerdingen, winners of the 2. Bundesliga Northern Division and 1. FC Saarbrücken, champions of the Southern Division.

Team overview

League table

Results

Top goalscorers
20 goals
  Ulf Kirsten (Bayer 04 Leverkusen)
  Anthony Yeboah (Eintracht Frankfurt)

17 goals
  Wynton Rufer (SV Werder Bremen)

15 goals
  Stéphane Chapuisat (Borussia Dortmund)

13 goals
  Andreas Thom (Bayer 04 Leverkusen)
  Fritz Walter (VfB Stuttgart)
  Uwe Wegmann (VfL Bochum)

11 goals
  Sergei Kiriakov (Karlsruher SC)
  Bruno Labbadia (FC Bayern Munich)

Champion squad

See also
 1992–93 2. Bundesliga
 1992–93 DFB-Pokal

References

External links
 DFB Bundesliga archive 1992/1993

Bundesliga seasons
1
Germany